Nicolás Marichal Pérez (born 17 March 2001) is a Uruguayan professional footballer who plays as a centre-back for Russian Premier League club Dynamo Moscow.

Career
Marichal started his youth football career with Nacional de Sarandí del Yí and joined Nacional later. He made his professional debut for the club on 8 February 2021 in a 3–0 league win against River Plate Montevideo.

On 30 August 2022, Marichal signed a five-year contract with Russian Premier League club FC Dynamo Moscow.

Career statistics

Honours
Nacional
Uruguayan Primera División: 2020, 2022
Supercopa Uruguaya: 2021

References

External links
 

2001 births
Living people
Association football defenders
Uruguayan footballers
Club Nacional de Football players
FC Dynamo Moscow players
Uruguayan Primera División players
Russian Premier League players
Uruguayan expatriate footballers
Expatriate footballers in Russia
Uruguayan expatriate sportspeople in Russia